Rashawn Shaquille Thomas (born August 15, 1994) is an American professional basketball player for Ulsan Hyundai Mobis Phoebus of the Korean Basketball League. He played college basketball for Texas A&M–Corpus Christi.

High school career
Thomas attended Southeast High School in Oklahoma City, Oklahoma He was an Oklahoman All-State selection in 2013.

College career
As a sophomore he was named to the Second Team All-Southland. As a junior, he was named Southland Defensive Player of the Year and was selected to the First Team All-Southland. He had 73 blocks, an Islander single season record, and nine double doubles, which led the conference. In a game against Texas State on December 5, 2015, Thomas pulled down 19 rebounds. Thomas averaged 16.6 points, 8.0 rebounds, and 2.3 blocks per game as a junior. Thomas scored 23 points in a 79–61 win over UMBC in the semifinals of the 2017 CollegeInsider.com Tournament. He surpassed the 2,000 point mark in his career, becoming the first Islander to do so. He averaged 22.5 points and 9.0 rebounds per game, and shot 53.4 percent from the field as a senior and repeated on the First Team All-Southland. Thomas participated in the Portsmouth Invitational Tournament, where he averaged 14 points in three games. For his career he averaged 16.3 points and 7.7 rebounds per game.

Professional career
After not being selected in the 2017 NBA Draft, he signed a partially guaranteed deal with the Oklahoma City Thunder and competed for them in the NBA Summer League. However, he was cut by the Thunder before appearing in a regular season game. Instead, he signed with their affiliate, the  Oklahoma City Blue of the NBA G League. In 36 games, Thomas averaged 13.5 points, 6.8 rebounds, 2.6 assists, and 1.5 steals per game.

On July 30, 2018, Thomas signed a deal with the Italian club Dinamo Sassari for the 2018–19 LBA season.

On July 9, 2019, Thomas signed a two-year deal with Serbian club Partizan Belgrade. He was arrested in July 2019 for drug possession. In July 2021, Thomas signed with Ulsan Hyundai Mobis Phoebus of the Korean Basketball League.

International career
In February 2018, Thomas was selected to the NBA G League USA roster for the NBA G League International Challenge.

References

External links
 Texas A&M–Corpus Christi Islanders bio

1994 births
Living people
American expatriate basketball people in Italy
American expatriate basketball people in Serbia
American men's basketball players
Basketball players from Oklahoma
Dinamo Sassari players
KK Partizan players
Lega Basket Serie A players
Oklahoma City Blue players
Power forwards (basketball)
Sportspeople from Oklahoma City
Texas A&M–Corpus Christi Islanders men's basketball players
United States men's national basketball team players